Susan Margaret Black, Baroness Black of Strome,  ( Gunn; born 7 May 1961) is a Scottish forensic anthropologist, anatomist and academic. She was the Pro Vice-Chancellor for Engagement at Lancaster University and is past President of the Royal Anthropological Institute of Great Britain and Ireland. From 2003 to 2018 she was Professor of Anatomy and Forensic Anthropology at the University of Dundee. She is President of St John's College, Oxford.

Education
Sue Black was born in Inverness and educated at Inverness Royal Academy. She attended the University of Aberdeen where she graduated with a BSc degree with honours in human anatomy in 1982, and a PhD degree for her thesis on 'Identification from the Human Skeleton' in 1986.

Career and research
In 1987 she was appointed a lecturer in Anatomy at St Thomas' Hospital, London, which started her career in forensic anthropology, serving in this role until 1992.

Between 1992 and 2003 she undertook contract work variously for UK's Foreign and Commonwealth Office (FCO) and the United Nations involving the identification of victims and perpetrators of various conflicts. In 1999, she became the lead forensic anthropologist to the British Forensic Team in Kosovo, deployed by the FCO on behalf of the United Nations and later that year deployed to Sierra Leone and Grenada.

In 2003 she undertook two tours to Iraq. In 2005 she participated in the United Kingdom's contribution to the Thai Tsunami Victim Identification operation (jointly led by the Thai and Australian Disaster Victim Identification (DVI) teams) as part of the 2004 Indian Ocean earthquake and tsunami international response.

In 2003 Black was appointed Professor of Anatomy and Forensic Anthropology at the University of Dundee. In 2005, she created the Centre for Anatomy and Human Identification at the University of Dundee (CAHID), which runs undergraduate courses in forensic anthropology and postgraduate courses in anatomy and advanced forensic anthropology. Her department trained the UK National Disaster Victim Identification (UK DVI) team for police and scientists in advanced mortuary practices.

Black has been an innovator in developing techniques  and building databases to confirm or disconfirm someone's identify based on photographs of their hands or arms.  This technique has become important for the prosecution of paedophiles, who often take and share photographs of their actions. In 2009, Black used vein pattern analysis to confirm the identify of a suspected child abuser, who then pled guilty. It was the first time that the technique was used in a criminal conviction.  

Black was a Director of the Centre for International Forensic Assistance and a founder of the British Association for Human Identification and the British Association for Forensic Anthropology.

In June 2018, Black left Dundee for Lancaster University, where she had been appointed pro-vice-chancellor for engagement. On 23 July 2021, it was announced that she had been elected the next President of St John's College, Oxford.

Black features in a larger-than-life portrait by  Ken Currie titled Unknown Man which hangs in the National Galleries of Scotland in Edinburgh.

Personal life 
Black is patron of a number of charities: Locate International, Archaeology Scotland, and E2M (Escape to Make). She has been married to Tom since 1993 and has three daughters: Elisabeth, Grace and Anna.

Publications
Black has authored and co-authored numerous works including:

 1997 Essential Anatomy for Anesthesia (co-author)
 2000 Developmental Juvenile Osteology (co-author)
 2004 The Juvenile Skeleton (co-author) 
 2009 Juvenile Osteology: A Laboratory and Field Manual (co-author)
 2009 "Forensic Anthropology" in Encyclopaedia of Forensic Sciences (co-author)
 2010 Disaster Victim Identification: The Practitioner's Guide (co-author)
 2010 "The Neonatal Ilium—Metaphyseal drivers and neurovascular passengers" in The Anatomical Record (co-author)
 2010 "Applying Virtual ID" in Police Professional (co-author)
 2011 Age Estimation in the Living: The Practitioners Guide (co-author)
 2011 Disaster Victim Identification: Experience and Practice (author)
 2011 Forensic Anthropology: 2000 to 2010 (co-author)
 2014 "Syrian detainee report" (co-author)
 2018 All That Remains: A Life in Death (author)
 2020 Written in Bone—Hidden Stories in What We Leave Behind (author)

Media
Black starred in BBC Two's History Cold Case, which aired two series between 2010 and 2011. In February 2013, she was assessed as one of the 100 Most Powerful Women in the UK by BBC Radio 4's Woman's Hour and in 2014 was also subject of The Life Scientific on the same station. In 2014, she appeared in the documentary "After the Wave: Ten years since the Boxing Day Tsunami" examining the forensic response in Thailand to the 2004 Indian Ocean earthquake and tsunami.

In October 2015, Black was the guest for BBC Radio 4's Desert Island Discs. Her choices included The Corries, Glenn Miller, Gerry Rafferty, Dire Straits and Cher. Her favourite was "Highland Cathedral" by Lathallan School. In July 2018 Black was the guest on BBC's Hard Talk.

Black delivered the 2022 series of Royal Institution Christmas Lectures, with the title "Secrets of Forensic Science".

Awards and honours
Black was elected a Fellow of the Royal Society of Edinburgh (FRSE) in 2005, a Fellow of the Royal Anthropological Institute, a Fellow of the Royal College of Physicians and an Honorary Fellow of the Royal College of Physicians and Surgeons of Glasgow. In 2008 she was awarded the Lucy Mair Medal from the Royal Anthropological Institute. and a police commendation for DVI training. In 2009 she was awarded the University of Aberdeen's Brian Cox Award for Public Engagement.

Black and her team at the Centre for Anatomy and Human Identification were awarded the University of Dundee's Stephen Fry Award for Public Engagement with Research in 2012 and the Queen's Anniversary Award for Higher Education in 2013 and in May 2014, she was awarded a prestigious Royal Society Wolfson Research Merit Award for her research into identification from the hand.

In 2001 Black was appointed Officer of the Order of the British Empire (OBE) for her services to forensic anthropology in Kosovo. She was promoted to Dame Commander of the Order of the British Empire (DBE) in the 2016 Birthday Honours for services to forensic anthropology.

In 2017 Black was presented with an honorary degree of Doctor of Medicine by University of St Andrews for her contribution to science and humanity. She received an honorary Doctorate of Science (DSc) from the University of Aberdeen in 2019, at a ceremony in which her daughter graduated in law. In 2018 her book All That Remains: A Life in Death won the Saltire Book of the Year award.

In 2021 she entered the House of Lords as a crossbencher peer, after she was created a Life Peer on 26 April 2021 and taking the title of The Baroness Black of Strome. Strome is in the County of Ross-shire.

References

 

1961 births
Living people
Academics of the University of Dundee
Alumni of the University of Aberdeen
Presidents of St John's College, Oxford
Fellows of the Royal Society of Edinburgh
Fellows of the Royal Anthropological Institute of Great Britain and Ireland
Fellows of the Royal College of Physicians
Fellows of the Royal College of Physicians and Surgeons of Glasgow
Fellows of the British Academy
Dames Commander of the Order of the British Empire
Forensic anthropologists
Presidents of the Royal Anthropological Institute of Great Britain and Ireland
People educated at Inverness Royal Academy
People from Inverness
Place of birth missing (living people)
Royal Society Wolfson Research Merit Award holders
Scottish scholars and academics
Scottish anthropologists
Scottish women anthropologists
Scottish women scientists
Scottish women academics
People's peers
Life peeresses created by Elizabeth II